Salvador Navarro Gutiérrez (born 8 January 1977) is a former professional tennis player from Spain.

Career
Navarro qualified for his only Grand Slam in 1997, at the French Open. He won his opening round match against countryman Marcos Aurelio Gorriz, in five sets, but would lose to Jan Siemerink in the second round.

He never made a quarter-final during his singles career on the ATP Tour but did have a win over world number 27 Sébastien Grosjean at the 2000 Torneo Godó, held in his hometown of Barcelona.

The right-hander also played doubles and was a semi-finalist, with partner Óscar Hernández, in the 2003 CAM Open Comunidad Valenciana. Despite only entering the tournament after another team withdrew, the Spanish pairing were able to upset third seeds Gastón Etlis and Martin Rodríguez in the quarter-finals.

Challenger titles

Singles: (2)

Doubles: (7)

References

1977 births
Living people
Spanish male tennis players
Tennis players from Barcelona